Alessandro Fattori (born 21 June 1973) is an Italian former alpine skier who competed in the 1994 Winter Olympics, 1998 Winter Olympics, and 2002 Winter Olympics.

Biography
Together with Kristian Ghedina, Peter Runggaldier, Werner Perathoner and Pietro Vitalini, he helped to bring out Italian Alpine skiing, traditionally more competitive in technical specialties, even in downhill and super-giant races. The Italian speed team, nicknamed Italjet, succeeded in the nineties in expressing itself at the high levels of the well-known Austrian and Swiss national teams.

World Cup podiums

See also
Italians who closed on the podium in the World Cup discipline standings

References

External links
 
 
 

1973 births
Living people
Italian male alpine skiers
Olympic alpine skiers of Italy
Alpine skiers at the 1994 Winter Olympics
Alpine skiers at the 1998 Winter Olympics
Alpine skiers at the 2002 Winter Olympics
Sportspeople from Parma
Alpine skiers of Fiamme Gialle